Jacob Fatu is an American professional wrestler currently signed to Major League Wrestling. He is a former one-time MLW World Heavyweight Champion and his reign is the longest in the title's history at 819 days. He also performs on the independent circuit.

Professional wrestling career

Early career (2012–2019) 
Jacob Fatu was trained by his uncle, Rikishi, and debuted in 2012 in a winning effort teaming with his relative, Black Pearl. He spent most of 2013 through 2015 competing in California for independent promotions, often teaming with fellow Anoa'i family members. In 2018, he made his first trip to Mexico for The Crash in a trios match, losing to Octagón and Blue Demon Jr.

Major League Wrestling (2019–present)

In 2019, he signed with Major League Wrestling, joining his relatives Samu and Samu's son, Lance Anoa'i in the company. Fatu debuted for MLW at their February event SuperFight, alongside his frequent tag team partner Josef Samael in a non-televised match. The duo of Fatu and Josef would then make their televised debut in MLW at Intimidation Games on March 2 by attacking the World Heavyweight Champion Tom Lawlor following his cage match against Low Ki, thus forming the heel stable Contra Unit with Simon Gotch. The following week, Contra Unit attacked Ace Romero during his match with Gotch. After months of feuding with Lawlor, Fatu defeated Lawlor at Kings of Colosseum on July 6 to capture the World Heavyweight Championship. He would also retain the title against Lawlor in a rematch. He then headlined MLW's first-ever pay-per-view event Saturday Night SuperFight, where Fatu successfully defended the title against LA Park.

After the feud, he was challenged by Alex Hammerstone for the belt, also putting the MLW National Openweight Championship on a winner takes all match. He lost the belt to Hammerstone. He then feuded with him, culminating in War Chamber, where Contra Unit lost the match, both ending the feud, and starting the feud with fellow Contra Unit member Madds Krügger and Ikuro Kwon. The feud stretched on, him repackaging with his vignette which cemented his face turn due to fan reaction, abandoning the Contra Unit character. The Samoan Werewolf traded victories against Krügger in several matches, including him winning against Krügger in a no disqualification match and the latter winning on a weapons match, culminating and settling the feud in Kings of Colosseum in a Weapons of Mass Destruction match. He also simultaneously feuded with Bestia 666.

Personal life 
Fatu was arrested for robbery as an 18-year-old. He credits seeing his cousins The Usos on a jail TV as his inspiration for becoming a wrestler.

Fatu is a member of the Anoa'i family wrestling dynasty, being the son of Sam Fatu. As of 2019, Fatu has six children.

Championships and accomplishments
All Pro Wrestling
APW Universal Heavyweight Championship (1 time)
APW Worldwide Internet Championship (1 time)
APW Tag Team Championship (1 time) – with Josef Samael
DEFY Wrestling
DEFY Tag Team 8XGP Championship (1 time) – with The Almighty Sheik
House of Glory
HOG World Heavyweight Championship (1 time, current)
Major League Wrestling
 MLW World Heavyweight Championship (1 time)
PCW Ultra
PCW ULTRA Heavyweight Championship (1 time, current)
PCW Ultra Tag Team Championship (1 time, current) – with The Almighty Sheik
 Pro Wrestling Illustrated
 Ranked No. 20 of the top 500 singles wrestlers in the PWI 500 in 2020
Supreme Pro Wrestling
SPW Tag Team Championship (1 time) – with Journey Fatu
West Coast Pro Wrestling
WCPW Heavyweight Championship (1 time)

References

External links 
 Samoan Dynasty
 
 
 

Living people
American professional wrestlers of Samoan descent
American male professional wrestlers
American people of Samoan descent
Professional wrestlers from California
Anoa'i family
21st-century professional wrestlers
MLW World Heavyweight Champions
1992 births